Deborah Erioluwapo Ajayi (born 11 July 1996) known as Omoshola is a Nigerian sex therapist, entrepreneur and founder of Omoshola's Place.

Early life and education 
Deborah is from Ijero local government in Ekiti state, but was born and raised in Ojota, Lagos State. For her primary education, she attended Victory Home School and Government Girls Science secondary school, Kuje for her secondary education. She had her remedial studies at Fabotas College of education in Kwara state. In 2016, she got admitted into Bingham University to study Medical Physiology but dropped out when she could no longer afford the fees. She is currently a part-time student at IMT business school in Dubai.

Career 
From the age of 12, Deborah started doing business selling hand-written story books, beads, flower vases and bags to family and friends. She also worked as a salesgirl in a bookstore at the age of 14. In 2013, she started a modeling agency which failed.

While still at Bingham University, she opened her first business outlet, a saloon in Abuja using her savings to finance it. After then, she went into sex-therapy and began selling aphrodisiac products specifically targeted at, but not limited to married women. As her business grew, she diversified into agriculture and started a farm in Abuja to raise livestock, she also launched other saloons, beauty spas and body enhancement shops.

Deborah was a victim of domestic violence as a child, and thus advocates for women to try as much as possible to keep their with the help of her products, like the Royal Honey Syrup.
She has also encouraged married women to view porn more regularly, maintain proper hygiene in order to increase chances of a romantically lasting marriage.

References

1996 births
21st-century Nigerian people
21st-century Nigerian businesspeople
Living people
People from Ekiti State